Thomas Cammerota O.P. (also Tommaso Malatesta) (died September, 1589) was a Roman Catholic prelate who served as Bishop of Vieste (1589).

Biography
Thomas Cammerota was ordained a priest in the Order of Preachers. On 17 July 1589, he was appointed during the papacy of Pope Sixtus V as Bishop of Vieste. On 26 July 1589, he was consecrated bishop by Girolamo Bernerio, Bishop of Ascoli Piceno, with Girolamo Bevilacqua, Titular Archbishop of Nazareth, and Gaspare Pasquali, Bishop of Ruvo, serving as co-consecrators. He served as Bishop of Vieste until his death in September 1589.

See also
Catholic Church in Italy

References

External links and additional sources
 (for Chronology of Bishops) 
 (for Chronology of Bishops)  

16th-century Italian Roman Catholic bishops
Bishops appointed by Pope Sixtus V
1589 deaths
Dominican bishops